Vicki Karaminas is a New Zealand fashion academic, and a full professor at Massey University.

Academic career

After a 2002 PhD titled  'Interrupted journeys : travelling light : [soma]tographies of space'  at the University of Technology, Sydney, Karaminas moved to Massey University, rising to full professor.

Selected works 
 Geczy, Adam, and Vicki Karaminas. Queer style. A&C Black, 2013.
 Geczy, Adam, and Vicki Karaminas, eds. Fashion and art. Berg, 2013.
 Wilson, Elizabeth, Christopher Breward, Shaun Cole, Peter McNeil, Vicki Karaminas, and Jonathan D. Katz. A queer history of fashion: From the closet to the catwalk. Edited by Valerie Steele. New Haven, CT: Yale University Press, 2013.
 Geczy, Adam, and Vicki Karaminas. "Fashion and art: Critical crossovers." Art Monthly Australia 242 (2011): 5.
 Peter McNeil and Vicki Karaminas. The Men's Fashion Reader

References

External links
 

Living people
Year of birth missing (living people)
New Zealand women academics
University of Technology Sydney alumni
Academic staff of the Massey University
Fashion historians
Fashion editors
New Zealand women writers